Thomas  Fitzsimons (October 1741August 26, 1811) was an Irish-born American Founding Father, merchant, banker, and politician. A resident of  Philadelphia, Fitzsimons represented Pennsylvania in the Continental Congress, was a delegate to Constitutional Convention, and served in U.S. Congress. He was a signatory of the Constitution of the United States. A slave owner, Fitzsimons was an early proponent of abolishing the slave trade in the newly formed nation.

Biography
Fitzsimons was born in the Kingdom of Ireland in 1741. In the mid-1750s his family immigrated to Philadelphia, and his father soon afterward. Fitzsimons had enough education that he could begin work as a clerk in a mercantile house. He married Catherine Meade on November 23, 1761, and formed a business partnership with her brother George. Their firm, which specialized in the West Indies trade, successfully operated for over 41 years.

Revolutionary bent
The firm was soon hit by the new revenue measures created to help support the finances of the Kingdom of Great Britain, including the much-reviled Stamp Act of 1765. Concerned with these ideas, Fitzsimons became active in the Irish merchant community in Philadelphia. He was a founding member of the Friendly Sons of St. Patrick in 1771 and later, in 1774, a steering committee organized to protest the Coercive Acts.

When Pennsylvania began mobilizing and organizing a militia to fight the British, Fitzsimons became involved. He served as captain of a company of home guards, which he raised under the command of Colonel John Cadwalader. Initially, his company served as part of the soldiers who manned posts along the New Jersey coast to defend against invasion. His unit later served as part of the reserve at the 1776 Battle of Trenton. Later in the war, he served on the Pennsylvania Council of Safety and headed a board to oversee the newly formed Pennsylvania Navy. Under this role, he helped organize the strategic resources of Pennsylvania and later provided supplies, ships, and money in support of Pennsylvanian and French forces.

Politics
Thomas Fitzsimons entered politics as a delegate to the Continental Congress in 1782 and 1783. He was a member of Pennsylvania House of Representatives from 1786 until 1795. He was also a delegate to the U.S. Constitutional Convention in 1787. Although not a leading member of that convention, he supported a strong national government, the end of slavery, the United States Congress's powers to impose a tariff on imports and exports, the granting of the House of Representatives, and power in equal to the United States Senate in making treaties. Based on debates had during the convention, he was not a supporter of universal suffrage. He was one of two Catholic signers of the United States Constitution, the other being Daniel Carroll of Maryland.

Fitzsimons was a supporter of the military, and he was not shy on sharing his opinion. He is known to have been open about his agreement on not dissolving the army until absolutely necessary.

After the Constitution was established, he served in the first three sessions of the House of Representatives as a Federalist, where he favored protective tariffs and a strong navy, co-drafting the 1794 law authorizing the original six frigates of the United States Navy. Fitzsimons failed to win re-election in 1794, being defeated by John Swanwick, who carried seven of Philadelphia's twelve districts with 57% of the vote. This was partially attributed to public opinion turning against the Federalist Party over the forceful suppression of the Whiskey Rebellion. Although he never held elective office again, Fitzsimons served in 1798 as head of the committee of merchants overseeing the subscription-loan to build a warship at private expense for use in the Quasi-War.

In 1796, FitzSimons, along with James Innes of Virginia, was appointed by President John Adams to serve as one of two American members on the five-man debt commission charged under Article VI of the Jay Treaty with examining the claims of British subjects unable to collect debts incurred by Americans prior to the American Revolution. FitzSimons, Innes, and, Samuel Sitgreaves, who replaced Innes upon the latter's death, became annoyed with the arguments used by their three British counterparts, Thomas Macdonald, Henry Pye Rich, and John Guillemard, to inflate the claims total, and FitzSimons and Sitgreaves angrily and permanently seceded from the board in July 1799. The claims were eventually disposed of by a lump-sum payment, agreed upon by United States Minister to Britain Rufus King with British Foreign Secretary Robert Banks Jenkinson and approved by President Thomas Jefferson and the Senate in 1802.

After withdrawing from politics, Fitzsimons remained active in civic and business affairs. He served as president of Philadelphia's Chamber of Commerce, as a trustee of the University of Pennsylvania, director of the Delaware Insurance Company, and a director of the Bank of North America from 1781 to 1803. He was a founder of the bank and supported efforts to found the College of Georgetown. Fitzsimons had also helped found the Insurance Company of North America.

Fitzsimons died on August 26, 1811, in Philadelphia, where he was buried in the cemetery of St. Mary's Catholic Church.

References

External links
 Biography at the United States Army Center of Military History
 Biography at the University of Pennsylvania Archives
 

1741 births
1811 deaths
Founding Fathers of the United States
People from County Wexford
Kingdom of Ireland emigrants to the Thirteen Colonies
People of colonial Pennsylvania
American people of Irish descent
Catholics from Pennsylvania
Continental Congressmen from Pennsylvania
Signers of the United States Constitution
Pro-Administration Party members of the United States House of Representatives from Pennsylvania
American slave owners
Politicians from Philadelphia
American militia officers
Pennsylvania militiamen in the American Revolution